Underground World Home was a home designed for the 1964 New York World's Fair by architect Jay Swayze. The home-exhibit was in Flushing Meadow Park in Queens and appeared to be a luxury bomb shelter which was marketed as secure and safe.

History 

The 1964 World's Fair featured the home which was designed by architect Jay Swayze. Swayze was a promoter of underground living and he lived in his own underground bunker-house in Plainview, Texas which was called the Atomitat.

Fairgoers could tour the home for the price of one dollar. It was a large underground bunker and it was unveiled in 1964 during the Cold War. It was also directly following the Cuban Missile Crisis when Americans were concerned about nuclear war. The company "Underground World Homes" was owned by Avon investor and millionaire Girard B. Henderson. He was convinced that the U.S. and the U.S.S.R. would escalate their conflict and it would lead to nuclear war. In addition to the underground home, there was also an exhibit sponsored by Henderson called: "Why Live Underground?" In the brochure for the Underground World Home, it was touted as a place of comfort, security and safety. 

The exhibitors at the fair were required to dismantle their exhibits after the fair. The home was 3 feet below surface and it is thought that because of the cost involved with removal, the home was simply buried and lost to history. The architect Swayze wrote a book Underground Gardens & Homes: The Best of Two Worlds, Above and Below but he did not say in the book what happened to the home. One researcher searched New York Public Library World's Fair records and found paperwork which said that demolition of the home was completed on 15 March 1966.

Design 

It featured air conditioning and backlit murals to create the illusion of outdoor lighting. The murals were hand painted by Mrs. Glenn Smith. The architect (Swayze) cited solid research to convince fairgoers that people did not look out their windows 80% of the time and when people did look out their windows, half the time what they saw was undesirable. He stated he could give people better views with murals. The home was billed as Peeping Tom proof, more fun, less expensive and a way to save space above ground.

The roof of the structure was supported with  steel beams and were rated for a load of two million pounds soil. There were 3 bedrooms. The earth provided the insulation for the building. The home had gypsum board ceilings. There was a "snorkel-like system" which pumped air into the home. Because of the air system the home was said to be dust free.

Inside the entrance there was an 11 by 13-foot entrance hall. There was a 13x23 kitchen-dining area, there was a living room and den which were 20x34 and three bedrooms measuring 16x21, 13x14 and 16x16. To connect the bedrooms there was a gallery measuring 6 feet in width. The model home also had a terrace area replicating outdoor space next to the living room, a second terrace leading to the exit, 12x32 feet wide. And there was a wood-burning fireplace.

Reception 
In 1964 New York Times reporter Isaac Asimov wondered what the 2014 World's Fair would look like. He called the underground house a "sign of the future" with controlled temperatures which allow occupants to be free from weather. The home was not popular at the fair. One reason may have been because it cost one dollar for an adult, and fifty cents for a child to tour the home. The home was priced at $80,000 (four times the cost of the average home that year) and Swayze did not sell any Underground World Homes at the fair.

References

External links 

 Underground Dream World
 Underground World Home Brochure

1964 introductions
1964 New York World's Fair
Air raid shelters
Cold War sites
Cold War
Nuclear fallout
Radiation protection
Subterranea (geography)
Survivalism